Charles Burley Ward, VC (10 July 1877 – 30 December 1921) was a British Army soldier and a recipient of the Victoria Cross, the highest award for gallantry in the face of the enemy that can be awarded to British and Commonwealth forces.

Victoria Cross

Ward was 22 years old, and a private in the 2nd Battalion, The King's Own Yorkshire Light Infantry, British Army during the Second Boer War when the following deed took place for which he was awarded the Victoria Cross (VC):

Further information

Ward was the last recipient of the VC to be decorated by Queen Victoria and later achieved the rank of company sergeant major.

Born in Leeds, Yorkshire, he died at Bridgend, Glamorgan and is buried in St Mary's Churchyard, Whitchurch, Cardiff.

A (silent) movie interview with Ward following his award of the VC was filmed by the Lancashire cinematographers Sagar Mitchell and James Kenyon; sealed in steel barrels after their company went out of business in the 1920s, the 800 films of their archive were discovered during demolition work in 1994, and have now been restored by the British Film Institute.

References

External links
Angloboerwar.com

1877 births
1921 deaths
King's Own Yorkshire Light Infantry soldiers
British recipients of the Victoria Cross
Second Boer War recipients of the Victoria Cross
British Army personnel of the Second Boer War
British Army recipients of the Victoria Cross
Military personnel from Leeds
Burials in Cardiff